Jean-Baptiste Garcia (born 25 November 1981), known by the pen name Jean-Baptiste Del Amo, is a French writer. He was born in Toulouse.

Selected works
 Ne rien faire et autres nouvelles (2006).
 Une éducation libertine (2008). A Libertine Education
 Le Sel (2010). Salt
 Pornographia (2013).
 Règne animal (2016). Animalia, trans. Frank Wynne (2019)
 L214, une voix pour les animaux (2017). L214: A Voice for Animals
 Comme toi (2017).
 Le Fils de l'homme (2021). The Son of Man

Awards and honors
Fénéon Prize (2008) for Une éducation libertine
Prix Goncourt du Premier Roman (2009) for Une éducation libertine
Prix Sade (2013) for Pornographia
Prix du Livre Inter (2017) for Règne animal
Prix du roman Fnac (2021) for Le Fils de l'homme

References

1981 births
Living people
Writers from Toulouse
21st-century French novelists
French male writers
Prix Goncourt du Premier Roman recipients
Prix Fénéon winners
21st-century French male writers
Prix du Livre Inter winners